Bahman Group (Gruh-e Bahman) is an Iranian car manufacturer which was originally registered under the name Iran Gulf Company on February 5, 1953. During the first seven years of its operations, the company was involved in maritime transportation. It then launched the production of three-wheeler Mazda pickup trucks. Soon after, following production of the Mazda Pick-up 1000 cc and 1600 cc, the name of the company was changed to “Mazda Car Manufacturing Plant”, and then renamed it to “Iran Vanet”. As Iran Vanet kept rolling down the path of development and progress, it was transformed in 1999 into a multi-disciplinary company involved in production of vehicles as well as commerce and investment.

In 2016, Bahman Group went private and with the privatization, the development of the company accelerated as it entered into partnerships with foreign automakers such as MAZDA, ISUZU, FAW, ZX and Great Wall. They became shareholders of Siba Motor Company after its creation in 2007. In 2013 Bahman Group formed a relationship with FAW Group, China's biggest automaker.

‌The Bahman Group has been listed annually for many years in the Iran 100 top companies based on assessments by the Industrial Management Institute (IMI).

Products

Current Automobiles
Respect
Fidelity
Dignity
Capra 2
Cara B2000

Former Automobiles
Mazda 323
Mazda 2
Mazda 3
Mazda 3 New
Besturn B50
Besturn B50F
Besturn B30
Capra 1
Cara 1700
Isuzu D-Max
Caro
Haval H2
Mitsubishi Pajero
Landmark
Haval H9

Truck
Isuzu NMR
Isuzu FVZ
Shiller 6 ton
Isuzu FVR
Isuzu NKR
Isuzu NPR
Isuzu FVZ
Tiger-v 6 Ton
Tiger-v 8 Ton
J6
CA 3250

Minibus
Sahar
Maxus
Shiller

Motorcycle
Azma 125
Azma 150
Azma 200
Arshia 125
Arshia 150
Arshia 200

References

External links
 Official Website

Bahman Group
Companies listed on the Tehran Stock Exchange
Vehicle manufacturing companies established in 1952
Truck manufacturers of Iran
Bus manufacturers of Iran
Manufacturing companies based in Tehran
Islamic Revolutionary Guard Corps

Motor vehicle engine manufacturers
Engine manufacturers of Iran
Iranian companies established in 1952